Elizabeth Parsons may refer to:
 Elizabeth Parsons (singer)
 Elizabeth Parsons (artist)
 Elizabeth Parsons, perpetrator of the Cock Lane ghost scam

See also
 Elizabeth Parson, British hymn writer